Madopterina is a true weevil subtribe in the subfamily Baridinae.

Genera
Azygides Pascoe, 1880
Centrinopsis Roelofs, 1875
Iasides Champion, 1907
Lipancylus Wollaston, 1873
Madopterus Schoenherr, 1836
Opseobaris Bondar, 1942
Pacomes Casey, 1922
Parallelosomus Schoenherr, 1844
Trachymeropsis Champion, 1907
Trachymerus Schoenherr, 1844
Xenopsilus Faust, 1899

References 

Baridinae
Insect subtribes